The Aeromedical Isolation Team (AIT, or SMART-AIT) of the US Army Medical Research Institute of Infectious Diseases (USAMRIID) at Fort Detrick, Maryland was a military rapid response team with worldwide airlift capability designed to safely evacuate and manage contagious patients under high-level (BSL-4) bio-containment conditions. Created in 1978, during its final years the AIT was one of MEDCOM’s Special Medical Augmentation Response Teams (SMART teams) comprising a portable containment laboratory along with its transit isolators for patient transport. Contingency missions included bioterrorism scenarios as well as the extraction of scientists with exotic infections from remote sites in foreign countries. The AIT trained continuously and was often put on alert status, but only deployed for “real world” missions four times. The AIT was decommissioned in 2010 and its mission was assumed by one of the US Air Force’s Critical Care Air Transport Teams (CCATTs).

History

The AIT was created in 1978 for purposes of contingency air evacuation of a hypothetical USAMRIID researcher who might become exposed to a highly infectious pathogen while undertaking endemic surveillance in remote areas of the world where a suspected or known disease outbreak was occurring. At the core of AIT operations was its specialized equipment, notably the Aircraft Transit Isolator (ATI). Developed by Vickers in the U.K. in the 1970s — and manufactured in later years by Elwyn Roberts Isolators, Shropshire, UK, until 2007 — the ATI was a self-contained unit capable of transporting a patient with a highly virulent disease and at the same time providing maximum microbiological security while full nursing care and treatment are rendered. It was designed to minimize the risk of transmission to air crews and caregivers, whether military or civilian. The interior of the isolator was maintained at a pressure negative to the external environment by a high-efficiency particulate air (HEPA) filtered blower. The isolator could be attached directly to a transfer port, situated on the external wall of the main USAMRIID building, to allow movement of the patient into a BSL-4 medical care suite without exposing the environment to the patient. While moving the isolator, team members wore protective suits and positive-pressure, HEPA-filtered Racal hoods (manufactured by Racal Health & Safety, Inc, Frederick, Maryland).

Throughout its existence the AIT was associated with a BSL-4 Medical Containment Suite (MCS, called “the Slammer”) at USAMRIID for ICU-level patient care under biocontainment. The MCS was built in 1969 and became operational in 1972; it was the destination to which contagious patients were to be removed by the AIT. Over the years the scope of the AIT/MCS mission was expanded to include U.S. military personnel, the U.S. Centers for Disease Control and Prevention, and U.S. citizens or foreign nationals deemed to be in need of service by the U.S. Department of State. Occasionally, the AIT trained with similar teams of foreign allies.

In 2007, due to the death of Mr Roberts, the ATI and associated products ceased to be manufactured. During 2008-2010, the AIT began preliminary training with, and testing of, a new transit isolator product — the Patient Isolation Unit (PIU) — developed by the Gentex Corporation under a contract with the U.S. Air Force.

The AIT was decommissioned — along with the MCS — in 2010 and its mission was assumed by one of the US Air Force’s Critical Care Air Transport Teams (CCATTs). The Air Force's capabilities, however, do not meet the standard of biocontainment (BSL-4) facilities, but rather represent enhanced patient isolation. No BSL-4 ICU facility has replaced the Army's former MCS to date.

Selected AIT alerts and deployments
Deployed to Reston, Virginia, Ebola outbreak, 1989
Deployed to Sweden in support of Marburg virus patient management, 1989
Alerted for Ebola outbreak in Zaire, 1993
On call for Yale researcher with Sabia virus exposure, 1994
Alerted for military physician Machupo virus exposure, 1994
Alert for Ebola, Zaire outbreak, 1995
Deployed to Wright-Patterson AFB, Bio-bomblets, Dec 1995
Alerted for deployment to Rwanda/Zaire 1996
NYC, Bronx Zoo, West Nile virus, Oct 1999
Alerted to support with possible Ebola exposure in Uganda, Dec 2000
Alerted for support with anthrax mailings, 2001
Alerted to support WTC attacks, 2001
On orders to support the Presidential State of the Union Address, 30 January 2002
On orders to support the Winter Olympics, 17 January to 20 March 2002
Advisors for SARS outbreak, 2003
Alerted for XDR-TB patient, May 2007
Alerted for Viral hemorrhagic fever outbreak in Congo, Aug 2007

See also
United States biological defense program
List of former United States Army medical units
Aeromedical Biological Containment System

References

Emergency medical responders
Military medical organizations of the United States
Biological hazards
Intensive care medicine
Medical units and formations of the United States Army
Emergency medicine
Air ambulance services in the United States
Military medicine in the United States
Aviation medicine
1978 establishments in Maryland
2010 disestablishments in Maryland
Fort Detrick